Raveendran began his career as a playback singer through the song "Parvanarajanithan" from a Malayalam film, Velliyazhcha. Later he associated with many composers and meanwhile served as a dubbing artist for films. He dubbed for actor Shankar in Aranjaanam directed by P. Venu. Primarily wished to become a playback singer, his destiny was changed by K. J. Yesudas, who realised his ability to create tunes which eventually led to his first movie Choola in 1979.

Film songs
Raveendran's film music composing career starts from the J. Sasikumar directed 1979 movie Choola, from which the song "Taarake mizhiyithalil kanneerumayi", rendered by his music college friend K. J. Yesudas, became a hit. In a career spanning 26 years, until his death in 2005, he composed music for about 148 movies (including unreleased movies) and about 30 studio albums.

1970s

1980s

1990s

2000s

Tamil films
Hemavin Kadhalargal (1985)
Kanmaniye Pesu (1985)
Rasigan Oru Rasigai (1986)
Lakshmi Vandhachu (1986)
Dharma Devathai (1986)
Thaaye Nee Thunai (1987)
Malare Kurinji Malare (1993)

Uncategorised

Studio albums

1980s

Reused tunes
The following films had tunes reused from previous Raveendran soundtracks:
 His Highness Abdullah (1990) from Oru May Maasa Pulariyil (1987) (1 song "Iru Hridayangalil" tune used in "Pramadavanam" which has high notes compared to former, and both composed in Jog)
 Oru Rasigan Oru Rasigai from Chiriyo Chiri ("Ezhisai Geethame" was a Tamil version of "Ezhu Swarangalum")
 Oru Rasigan Oru Rasigai from Thenum Vayabhum ("Paadi Azhaithen" was a Tamil version of "Thenum Vayambhum Raavil")

As a playback singer

References

External links
Soundtracks composed by Raveendran from 1979 to 1984
Soundtracks composed by Raveendran from 1985 to 1990
Soundtracks composed by Raveendran from 1991 to 1994
Soundtracks composed by Raveendran from 1995 to 2000
Soundtracks composed by Raveendran from 2001 to 2006
 

Raveendran
Discographies of Indian artists